The Clerkenwell cinema fire occurred in the Dream City adult cinema (also known as the 'New City Cinema') at 7 St John Street, Clerkenwell, London, United Kingdom, on 26 February 1994. Due to the pornographic nature of the films it screened, and the strict cinema licensing regulations in London at the time, the cinema was operating illegally, and thus was not subject to fire inspections as legal entertainment venues were.

Fire 
The fire was caused by arson when a deaf, homeless man called David Lauwers (known to his friends as 'Deaf Dave') lost a fight with a doorman about needing to pay the entry fee again, having earlier left the club. After being ejected from the cinema, Lauwers returned with a can of petrol and set fire to the entrance area. The fire took hold rapidly, trapping most of the staff and patrons within. Eight men died at the scene, seven from smoke inhalation and one from injuries sustained from jumping from a high window in the building, and there were three further fatalities in the following months in hospital, as well as thirteen injuries.

On learning of the gravity of the situation, Lauwers handed himself in to Walthamstow police station, and was later given a life sentence on three sample charges of manslaughter.

Lauwers died aged 41 in prison from a heart attack in 2001.

See also
 Denmark Place fire

References

1994 crimes in the United Kingdom
1994 fires in the United Kingdom
1994 in British cinema
1994 in London
1990s crimes in London
Arson in London
Arson in the 1990s
Attacks on buildings and structures in 1994
Attacks on buildings and structures in London
Attacks on cinemas
Building and structure fires in London
Cinema fire
February 1994 crimes
February 1994 events in the United Kingdom
History of the London Borough of Islington
Manslaughter in London